The Siret–Prut–Nistru Euroregion is located in Romania and Moldova. The administrative center is Iaşi.  This Euroregion was founded in 2002.
Euroregions

Largest cities
Romania: Iaşi (316,000), Bacău (175.921), Piatra Neamţ (104,914), Focşani (101,854), Vaslui (70,267), Bârlad (78,633), Roman (69,483) and Oneşti (51,681)
Republic of Moldova: Chişinău (593,800), Bălţi (127,600), Tighina (97,027), Tiraspol (159,163)

References

Geography of Romania
Geography of Moldova